Vaidehi Kathirunthal is a 1984 Indian Tamil-language romantic drama film written and directed by R. Sundarrajan. The film stars Vijayakanth and Revathi as two villagers, Vellaisamy and Vaidehi, whose lives undergo a drastic turn when they meet. They discover that they must join forces to save a young couple from the wrath of the other villagers.

Vaidehi Kaathirundhals story was developed based on songs that Ilaiyaraaja had composed, hoping to use them in potential film. The film was released on 23 October 1984, became a huge commercial success and emerged a breakthrough in Vijayakanth's career. It was remade in Telugu as Manchi Manasulu (1986), and in Kannada as Preethi Nee Illade Naa Hegirali (2004).

Plot 
Vellaisamy is an unkempt derelict who lives by the village temple doing menial jobs to survive but has an impressive singing ability. Vaidehi is a young widow who lives in the village with her sorrowing, alcoholic father. Minutes after Vaidehi's marriage, the groom and his parents died in a boat accident. This led to the village ostracising her and not letting her practice dance, which she was talented in. Her father, though rich, took to drinking upon seeing his daughter's fate.

One day when some villagers spot Vellaisamy scribbling Vaidehi's name on the temple walls, rumours about them start circling. When a distressed Vaidehi approaches and questions Vellaisamy why he has been writing her name of walls, he reveals his tragic past and how he lost the woman of his affection, also named Vaidehi.

Vellaisamy and his widowed mother lived in another village. His cousin Vaidehi, who was also brought up with him, had high hopes of marrying Vellaisamy. Despite being in love with Vaidehi, Vellaisamy neglected her for fun. After buying wedding jewels for Vaidehi, he played a final prank on her, by telling her that he has been engaged with someone else. Distraught, Vaidehi ate poisonous seeds, and died in Vellaisamy's arms. Within weeks, Vellaisamy's mother also died. Vellaisamy gave his properties to poor people, and moved to his present village for closure.

Vellaisamy and Vaidehi now share a mutual respect for each other's melancholic lives but soon realise they need to work together to unite Nataraj and Sengamalam, a young couple in love, against the wrath of the whole village, particularly Sengamalam's ruthless brother Vellikizhamai Ramasamy. Vellaisamy is killed by Ramasamy's goons in the melee, and the young lovers are united, while Vaidehi is left alone.

Cast 
 Vijayakanth as Vellaisamy
 Revathi as Vaidehi
 Goundamani as All in All Azhaguraja
 Senthil as Komuti Thalaiya
 Kokila as Sengamalam
Parimalam as Vaidehi, Vellaisamy's past lover
 Sivankumar as Nataraj
 T. S. Raghavendar as Vaidehi's father
 Radha Ravi as Vellikizhamai Ramasamy
 Vadivukkarasi as Vellaisamy's Mother
 Balu Anand
 Usilai Mani as shopkeeper
 Kovai Sarala as All in All Azhaguraja's wife

Production 
After Ilaiyaraaja finished composing the songs of Kaakki Sattai (1985) in half-a-day, well before the three-day schedule, he started to compose other songs since he was free at that time; he ended up composing six songs, hoping to use them in a potential film. Producer-lyricist Panchu Arunachalam, who used to listen to Ilaiyaraaja's unused songs and pick any of them he liked for future projects, wanted one of the six tunes for the film that would become Vaidehi Kathirunthal. But Ilaiyaraaja insisted that he listen to all six tunes; the producer did so, and the storyline of Vaidehi Kathirunthal was developed based on them.

The title was derived from a line from the song "Vasanthathil Orr Naal" from Moondru Deivangal (1971) which goes, "Vasanthaththil or naal Manavarai oram Vaidhegi kaththirunthaalo". The film was written and directed by R. Sundarrajan, and produced by Thooyavan under the banner Appu Movies, while Arunachalam was credited as presenter. Cinematography was handled by Raja Rajan, and editing by M. Shrinivasan and B. Krishnakumar. Vijayakanth agreed to play a "soft role" at a time when he starred in many action films and was branded an action hero. This was the Tamil debut of Kannada actress Pramila Joshai (credited as Parimalam), and the feature film debut of T. S. Raghavendra (credited as Raghavendar) and Sivankumar. Shooting took place predominantly at the banks of Kanchima (Noyyal) River.

Soundtrack 
The music was composed by Ilaiyaraaja. The song "Kaathirunthu" is set in the Carnatic raga known as Shivaranjani, "Azhagu Malaraada" is set in Chandrakauns, and "Inraiku Yen Indha" is set in Abhogi. Y. G. Mahendran's wife Sudha had been contacted by Ilaiyaraaja's manager to sing in the film but, incorrectly believing it was a prank call, declined. For every day Vaidehi Kaathirundhal played at a theatre in Cumbum, "Rasathi Unna" attracted the attention of wild elephants which came near the theatre and remained till the song ended before returning to the forest. P. Jayachandran, the singer of this song, "Kaathirunthu" and "Inraiku Yen Indha", said all three songs were recorded within a day.

Release and reception 
Vaidehi Kaathirundhal was released on 23 October 1984, Diwali day. The Tamil magazine Ananda Vikatan, in its issue dated 2 December 1984, carried the reviews of multiple people who had seen the film. The review board of the magazine gave the film a rating of 44 out of 100 based on these reviews, with the consensus being favourable towards Ilaiyaraaja's music and critical towards the multiple storylines stitched together. Kalki critic posted similar views, praising the music but noting that despite so many positives, the film fell apart due to the subpar story. Despite facing competition from other Diwali releases such as Nallavanukku Nallavan and the Tamil-dubbed version of the Malayalam-language My Dear Kuttichathan, the film was a commercial success, running for over 100 days in theatres. It was remade in Telugu as Manchi Manasulu (1986), and in Kannada as Preethi Nee Illade Naa Hegirali (2004).

Legacy 
Vaidehi Kaathirundhal emerged a breakthrough in Vijayakanth's career. According to film journalist Sreedhar Pillai, it was one of the films that made him the "Raja of B and C stations" The waterfalls where the film was shot was renamed Vaideki Falls after the film. The quote "Petromax lightey venuma" spoken by Goundamani's character became a popular phrase in Tamil Nadu and refers to someone wanting and persisting on something particular. The quote also inspired a song of the same name in Aranmanai (2014). The Chennai-based brand Dude Thamizha prints T-shirts that carry the dialogue which are their best-sellers too. The character name of Goundamani, All in All Azhagu Raja, was also used as the title a 2013 film, while the 2019 film Petromax derives its title from All in All Azhagu Raja's dialogue.

References

Bibliography

External links 

1980s Tamil-language films
1984 films
1984 romantic drama films
Films directed by R. Sundarrajan
Films scored by Ilaiyaraaja
Indian romantic drama films
Tamil films remade in other languages